Meeting in the Ladies Room is the third studio album by Klymaxx, released in 1984. In the US, it reached No. 18 on the Billboard 200 and No. 9 on the R&B album chart. It is certified Platinum.

Klymaxx gained airplay on MTV, VH1 and BET with the release of their single "The Men All Pause" that reached No. 5 on the R&B chart, No. 80 on the Billboard Hot 100 and No. 9 on the Billboard Hot Dance Club Play chart. The title track reached No. 59 on the Hot 100 and No. 4 on the R&B chart. The third single, "I Miss You", reached No. 5 on the Hot 100, No. 11 on the R&B chart and No. 1 on the adult contemporary chart and was certified gold. The fourth, and final, single, "Lock and Key", reached No. 47 on the R&B chart. A young Vivica A. Fox appeared in the accompanying music video.

Track listing
"The Men All Pause" (Cooper, Irby) - 7:10
"Lock and Key" (Cooper, V. Spino) - 5:37
"I Miss You" (Malsby) - 5:32
"Just Our Luck" (Joseph Conlon, Barry De Vorzon) - 4:27
"Meeting in the Ladies Room" (Reggie Calloway, Vincent Calloway, Bo Watson) - 5:15
"Video Kid" (Irby) - 3:42
"Ask Me No Questions" (Malsby, C. Lucas) - 3:37
"Love Bandit" (R. Calloway, B. Simmons, Billy C. Farlow) - 5:06
"I Betcha" (Irby, Malsby) - 3:36

Singles released
"The Men All Pause"
"Meeting in the Ladies Room"
"I Miss You"
"Lock and Key"

Personnel 
 Lorena Porter Hardimon – lead vocals (2, 5-9), backing vocals (1, 2, 4-9)
 Cheryl Cooley – guitars, backing vocals (1, 2, 4-9)
 Robbin Grider – guitars, keyboards, backing vocals (1, 2, 4-9)
 Lynn Malsby – keyboards, backing vocals (1, 2, 4-9)
 Joyce "Fenderella" Irby – bass guitar, lead vocals (1, 3, 4, 6, 9), backing vocals (1, 2, 4-9)
 Bernadette Cooper – drums, percussion, lead vocals (1), backing vocals (1, 2, 4-9)

Additional Personnel
 Julia Waters – backing vocals (3)
 Maxine Waters – backing vocals (3)
 Oren Waters – backing vocals (3)

Production
 Stephen Shockley – producer (1)
 Jimmy Jam and Terry Lewis – producers (2)
 Bernadette Cooper – co-producer (2)
 Klymaxx – producers (3, 7)
 Lynn Malsby – co-producer (3, 7)
 Joseph Conlan – producer (4)
 Barry De Vorzon – producer (4)
 Vincent Calloway – producer (5, 8)
 Bo Watson – producer (5, 8)
 Reggie Calloway – associate producer (5, 8)
 Joyce "Fenderella" Irby – producer (6, 9)
 Dick Griffey – executive producer 
 Dina Andrews – A&R coordination
 Regina Griffey – A&R coordination
 Brenda Patrick – A&R assistant 
 Sabrina Buchanek – engineer
 Michael Carnevale – engineer
 George Doering – engineer, mixing 
 Michael Frenke – engineer, mixing
 Taavi Mote – engineer, mixing 
 Judy Clapp – assistant engineer 
 Steve MacMillan – assistant engineer
 Steve Hodge – mixing 
 Rick Probst – mixing 
 Wally Traugott – mastering 
 Jeff Adamoff – art direction, design 
 Vartan Kurjian – art direction, design
 Darius Anthony – photography 
 Mark Sokol – background photography 
 Studios 
 Recorded at Ivar Studios and Larrabee Sound Studios (Hollywood, California); Doering Studios and Studio Masters (Los Angeles, California); Creation Studios (Minneapolis, Minnesota).
 Mixed at Larrabee Sound Studios and Soundcastle (Hollywood, California); Doering Studios (Los Angeles, California); Kendun Recorders (Burbank, California).
 Mastered at Capitol Studios (Hollywood, California).

References

External links
Meeting in the Ladies Room at Discogs

1984 albums
Klymaxx albums
Albums produced by Jimmy Jam and Terry Lewis
MCA Records albums